Walling Imomenba is an Indian cricketer. He made his first-class debut on 12 February 2020, for Nagaland in the 2019–20 Ranji Trophy.

References

External links
 

Year of birth missing (living people)
Living people
Indian cricketers
Nagaland cricketers
Place of birth missing (living people)